The Governor of Iloilo is the local chief executive of the Philippine province of Iloilo. The governor holds office at the Iloilo Provincial Capitol located at Bonifacio Drive, Iloilo City. Like all local government heads in the Philippines, the governor is elected via popular vote, and may not be elected for a fourth consecutive term (although the former governor may return to office after an interval of one term). In case of death, resignation or incapacity, the vice governor becomes the governor. Along with the governors of Aklan, Antique, Capiz, Guimaras and Negros Occidental, he sits in the Regional Development Council of the Western Visayas Region.

The current governor is Arthur Defensor Jr. who took the seat for the first time starting July 1, 2019 replacing his father Arthur Defensor Sr. who completed the full three terms as provincial governor.

History

The first Alcalde-Mayor (present-day governor) of Iloilo province to be appointed by the Spanish monarch was Diego de la Correa who held this position from 1634 - 1636. In the early years of Spanish settlement, only a handful of towns has been established. In 1565, the Legazpi expedition which include Mateo del Saz, the Maestre de Campo (Ship Commander), Juan de la Isla and Father Martin de Rada exploring the islands in search for food reached the northeastern portion of Panay island. Father Martin de Rada founded Araut (present day Dumangas) in the same year 1565 becoming the oldest town in Iloilo and built a small chapel there. A Spanish settlement was established in Ogtong (present day Oton) and made the pueblo of the province in 1570. Due to the frequent raids of the Moro pirates from Mindanao, Dutch and English buccaneers posed a threat to Ogtong, the capital of the province was transferred to La Villa Rica de Arevalo in 1581. It then becomes the seat of Spanish government of the whole of Iloilo, Panay (Capiz, Aklan and Antique), Negros, Guimaras, Cuyu-Palawan, Caluya, Romblon, and Boracay as Miguel Loarca wrote. Other towns established at these period were Pototan, Sibucao (now Passi City) and Dingle, Laglag (now Dueñas), Salog (now Jaro, Iloilo City), Guimbal(1703), Miagao(1716), Leon(1730), Cabatuan(1733), Alimodian(1754), Igbaras(1761), Janiuay(1769), Tubungan(1768), Santa Barbara and Maasin are among the first group of villages that were given a pueblo (town hood) status.

Provincial Capitol

The old Iloilo Provincial Capitol was the office of the provincial government and official residence of the governor since 1849 with the original structure made out of wood and stone. The new modern Iloilo Provincial Capitol was constructed just behind the old provincial capitol and was completed in 2006. It was designed by Architect Guillermo Hisancha. The old provincial capitol has been renovated and restored to its former glory and is now being used as a lobby and reception area for visiting guests and dignitaries. In front of the capitol stands the Arroyo Fountain built in 1928 in honor of Senator Jose Maria Arroyo from Molo, Iloilo City who sponsored a bill creating the Iloilo Metropolitan Water Works. The fountain also serves as the Kilometer Zero or a point of reference in measuring distances in the city and province of Iloilo and also to various points and destinations in Panay Island from Iloilo City.

List of governors

These are the lists of governors who served the province of Iloilo since the early Spanish settlement in the 1600s to the present day.

Spanish Alcalde Mayores (governors) of Iloilo Province 

After the Spanish settlement was first established in 1570, towns were settled, established and were granted town hood status. By this time, the Spanish government appoints an alcalde mayor to govern the provincial government and surrounding jurisdictions.

American Commonwealth Period civil governors

As the last Spanish politico-military governor (alcalde-mayor) of Iloilo province, Ricardo Monet who served during the last remaining months of 1898 appointed Martin Delgado as captain and commander of the 125-strong voluntarios in Sta. Barbara.

On August 13, 1898, the United States had already bought Manila, Philippines and agreed to spare Iloilo to Spain. Negotiations between the United States and Spain was finished. They made a mock drama on May 10, 1898 that an American vessel will fire a Spanish ship on Manila Bay then they will surrender to America not to a loose platoon of Emilio Aguinaldo in Intramuros. The Americans occupied Manila and raised their flag in Intramuros. Spain's dream is to establish a Spanish kingdom in Iloilo its loyal and devoted province and totally relinquish its right in the entire Philippines.

Gen. Pablo Araneta appointed Martin Delgado as "General en Jefe de los Tropas del Ejercito Libertador de Visayas y Governador Politico-Militar". On October 28, 1898, Delgado marched into Santa Barbara and took control of the municipal building.

Meanwhile, Spanish governor-general Diego de los Ríos left Manila and sailed to Iloilo and established the last Spanish capital in the Orient in Iloilo City. General de los Rios asked Spain to grant some reforms demanded by the representative citizens of Iloilo. He issued in Iloilo a proclamation to the people of the Visayas calling on them to establish a "Council of Reforms" to be made up of 24 leading citizens, 12 of whom would be selected by popular vote, another 12 to be appointed by the general himself. 
 
General de los Rios was obviously sincere in bringing about the reforms people asked for. The granted reforms, however, satisfied only a few ilustrado leaders. Things did not turn out the way it should be. There was widespread oppositions of their offer. The flame of rebellion already swept Iloilo towns, Panay and Negros under Comite Conspirador. Their swift decision is to forego more battle and to peacefully grant sovereignty to Iloilo and to vacate the place and let Americans finished the job. If Ilonggos would have remained loyal to Spain, it would have not encountered the canons of the Americans.

On February 6, 1901, several days after the passage of the Municipal Code, the Philippine Commission passed the Act No. 83 or the Provincial Government Act. It states that every province shall have elected provincial governor. Election is also to be held to also elect a provincial secretary, a provincial treasurer, a provincial supervisor and a provincial fiscal.

On February 2, 1901 during the fiesta celebration of Jaro, General Delgado weary of war and poorly armed formally surrendered in Jaro to the American military governor Edmund Rice. Many of the rebel leaders surrendered.

He was recognized by the Americans as "the ablest leader" on the island. Delgado was appointed as the first governor of Iloilo province upon the establishment of the civil government on April 11, 1901. Jovito Yusay was given the provincial government secretary with a yearly stipend of $1,800 gold. Quintin Salas and his Chief of Staff. Lt. Col. Francisco Jalandoni were the last to lay down their arms on October 4, 1901. Here are the governors of the province during the American Commonwealth Period.

World War II governors

These were the provincial governors of Iloilo during the dark years of World War II.

Post-war to present governors

These are the governors of the province after the war up to the present.

References 

Governors of provinces of the Philippines
Iloilo